Huddersfield Town's 1939-40 campaign saw Town play in Division 1, before the season was abandoned following the outbreak of World War II. They then played in the North-East League and won the title by 9 points from Newcastle United.

Squad who played in the league matches

Results

Division One

North-East Division

League War Cup

Footnotes

A.  Match abandoned after 61 minutes due to a storm, but the result was allowed to stand.

Huddersfield Town A.F.C. seasons
Huddersfield Town